Czeska Wieś  ("Czech village"), formerly German Böhmischdorf, is a village in Poland situated in Opole Voivodeship, in Brzeg County, in Gmina Olszanka.

References

Villages in Brzeg County